Sushil is a first name often found in Hindu and Buddhist community. It is also a common adjective found in South Asia :such as in  Nepali , Hindi, Oriya, Marathi, and Gujarati. The word has its root in Sanskrit. It means "good charactered man" or virtuous, intelligent, or studious. The feminine form (Sushila) also means clever or intelligent.

Hindu given names